The PBA Governors' Cup is a tournament of the Philippine Basketball Association. Along with the PBA Commissioner's Cup, the tournament is one of the two conferences that allows teams to hire a single foreign player, also known as an "import". The tournament was first held in 1993 as the third conference of the PBA season.

It was discontinued in 2003 when the Reinforced Conference was revived. From 2004 to 2010, the league only held two conferences in a season; one All-Filipino tournament, named as the Philippine Cup and one with imports, named as the Fiesta Conference The tournament was re-instated in 2011 as the third conference of the PBA season after the league re-adopted the three conference format.

The Governors' Cup also refers to the trophy awarded to the champion team.

History
During the 1993 PBA season, the league renamed the Third Conference as the Governors' Cup, a reference to the members of the PBA Board of Governors. The singular name "Governor" refers to the board representative of each team. The conference usually was the last tournament held in a PBA season.

After San Miguel won the first Governors Cup in 1993, Alaska dominated the tournament from 1994-1997. In 1998, due to the league's commitment with the Philippine Centennial Team, they allowed each team to take two imports with a combined height of 12 feet. Shell, with no players taken for the national team, won the tournament over Mobiline.

San Miguel Beer won the tournament from 1999-2000 before Sta. Lucia upset the Beermen a year later, giving the Realtors its first PBA title. In 2002, due to the league's commitment to the national team, the Governors Cup became the first conference, while moving the All-Filipino Conference as its third and last tournament. Since most of the teams' star players were with the national squad, the PBA once again allowed teams to take two imports with a 12-foot maximum total height limit. Purefoods beat Alaska in seven games to win the title.

The tournament was retired in 2003 after the re-introduction of the Reinforced Conference as the third conference of the season but was eventually reactivated in 2011 after the league restored the three-conference season format.

Tournament format
From 1993 to 1995, the teams were divided into two groups in the group stage. The teams in the same group will play against each other once and against teams in the other group twice. After the eliminations, the top five teams will advance to a double round-robin semifinals. A playoff incentive will be given to a team that will win five of their eight semifinal games should they fail to get the top two finals berths. The top two teams (or the No. 1 team and the winner of the playoff between team with at least 5 semifinal wins and the No. 2 team) will face each other in a best-of-seven championship series.

In 1996, the league adopted a quarterfinal-semifinal playoff format with the top two seeds advancing automatically to the semifinals and the next four teams will be matched up in the quarterfinals after the eliminations.

A different tournament format was used in 1998 when it carried over the elimination standings of the preceding Centennial Cup. The teams were pitted again in a single round-robin eliminations with the top four teams advancing to the semifinals. The remaining teams will compete in a single round-robin semifinals, with the top two teams advancing in the finals.

In 1999, a new quarterfinal-semifinal playoff format was introduced due to the entry of the Tanduay Rhum Masters. The top eight teams after a round-robin eliminations will advance to the quarterfinals. The top two seeds will have a twice-to-beat advantage against the last two seeded teams. Other seeded teams will compete in a best-of-three playoffs.

After the reintroduction of the tournament in 2011, the league adopted a tournament format similar on what was used in 1995. Dubbed as the "classic PBA format", the tournament begins in a single round-robin eliminations. The top six teams will advance in a single round-robin semifinals. A playoff incentive will be given to a team that will win four of their five semifinal games should they fail to get the top two finals berths. The top two teams (or the No. 1 team and the winner of the playoff between team with at least 5 semifinal wins and the No. 2 team) will face each other in a best-of-seven championship series.

The tournament format since the 2013 edition was changed to a quarterfinal-semifinal playoff format. The top eight teams after a single round-robin group stage will advance to the quarterfinals. The top four teams will have a twice-to-beat incentive against their opponents during this round. The winners will advance to a best of five semifinal round and the winners of this round will meet in a best-of-seven championship series.

Import rules
The height limit for import players varies from every year. In 2011, the height adopted a handicapping system in which the top two teams of the combined results of the Philippine and Commissioner's Cups are allowed to have an import with a 6'2" (1.88 m) height limit. The next four teams will be allowed with a 6'4" (1.93 m) import and the last two teams will be allowed with a 6'6" (1.98 m) import. In 2012, the handicapping was scrapped and the league set the height limit of imports to 6'5" (1.95 m).

While the tournament is underway, a team can play with an All-Filipino lineup only once. Imports can be replaced in the whole duration of the tournament (including finals).

Teams were allowed to hire an additional import with Asian heritage (called as the Asian import) with a height limit of 6'3", from 2015 to 2016. The Asian heritage import provision was shelved in 2017 in lieu of the upcoming FIBA Asia Cup.

Trophy design

The trophy design used since the 1994 season features the Governors' Cup with the league logo at the front. The cup is placed in a base where all of the logos of the participating teams of the tournament are engraved. A unique feature of this trophy is that the champion team's logo is placed at the front middle of the trophy with the runner-up at its left and the third place at the right. The rest of the team logos are arranged according to their rankings at the conclusion of the tournament. 
Red, blue and yellow ribbons were placed in the handles of the trophy, mirroring the colors in the PBA logo. The winner keeps permanent possession of the trophy and a new one is created every year. In 2012, the trophy's cup handles were modified and the league logo was replaced with the tournament's season logo.

List of champions

Per season

Per franchise

* Defunct franchise

Individual awards

Best Player of the Conference

Bobby Parks Best Import award

References

External links
 PBA.ph

 
Governors Cup
Recurring sporting events established in 1993